Tamagnini is a surname. Notable people with the surname include:

Lucia Tamagnini (1963–) Sammarinese politician
Filippo Tamagnini (1972–), Sammarinese politician
Roberto Tamagnini (1942–), Sammarinese sports shooter
Vittorio Tamagnini (1910–1981), Italian bantamweight boxer